Valley Fair Mall is a  single-level regional shopping center located in West Valley City, Utah, United States. Anchor stores are All Star Bowling & Entertainment, Hobby Lobby, JCPenney, Megaplex Theatres, Old Navy, Ross Dress For Less, and Ulta Beauty.

History
The shopping center was constructed in 1970 on the southwest corner of the I-215 belt route and West 3500 South (Utah State Route 171 in the Salt Lake Valley. Valley Fair Mall hosts approximately 120 in-line shops, a 13-bay, 450-seat food court, 15-screen Megaplex movie theater. 

In 2005 Satterfield Helm Management, Inc. of Sandy, Utah purchased the mall and in 2006 announced plans for a renovation of the center. A new Costco store opened in 2007 as the first part of a four-phase redevelopment. Phase II of the redevelopment was completed in June 2010.

Macy's, formerly ZCMI and Meier & Frank, closed in 2016 and became All Star Bowling & Entertainment and Hobby Lobby in 2019.

On January 21, 2020, it was announced that Bed Bath & Beyond would be closing as part of a plan to close 40 stores nationwide.

References

External links

Buildings and structures in West Valley City, Utah
Shopping malls established in 1970
Shopping malls in Utah
Tourist attractions in Salt Lake County, Utah
1970 establishments in Utah